The 1969–70 Shell Shield season was the fourth edition of what is now the Regional Four Day Competition, the domestic first-class cricket competition for the countries of the West Indies Cricket Board (WICB). The tournament was sponsored by Royal Dutch Shell, with matches played from 30 January to 21 March 1970.

Five teams contested the competition – Barbados, the Combined Islands, Guyana, Jamaica, and Trinidad and Tobago. The Combined Islands team, comprising players from the Leeward and Windward Islands, was returning for the first time since the 1966–67 season. They failed to win a match, while at the top of the table Trinidad and Tobago won three of their four matches, claiming their maiden title. Trinidadian batsman Joey Carew led the tournament in runs, while Jamaican leg spinner Arthur Barrett was the leading wicket-taker.

Points table

Key

 Pld – Matches played
 W – Outright win (12 points)
 L – Outright loss (0 points)

 DWF – Drawn, but won first innings (6 points)
 DLF – Drawn, but lost first innings (2 points)
 Pts – Total points

Statistics

Most runs
The top five run-scorers are included in this table, listed by runs scored and then by batting average.

Most wickets

The top five wicket-takers are listed in this table, listed by wickets taken and then by bowling average.

References

West Indian cricket seasons from 1945–46 to 1969–70
1970 in West Indian cricket
Regional Four Day Competition seasons
Domestic cricket competitions in 1969–70